La Copa Junior (2010) (Spanish for "The Junior Cup") was a professional wrestling tournament produced and scripted by the Mexican wrestling promotion Consejo Mundial de Lucha Libre (CMLLl; Spanish "World Wrestling Council"). The tournament ran from December 10, 2010 to December 25, 2010 in Arena México in Mexico City, Mexico. CMLL's recurring La Copa Junior tournament featured second, third or fourth generation wrestlers completing against each other. The 2010 version of the La Copa Junior was the fourth tournament held by CMLL.

After not being promoted for three years CMLL brought La Copa Junior back as a late in the year tournament. The tournament included 20 wrestlers, four more than the other tournaments. the tournament was split into 2 blocks of 10 wrestlers, with a seeding Battle royal, where the final two wrestlers in the ring would only have to win one match to get into the semifinal, while everyone else in the block would have to win three. Dragón Rojo Jr. won Block A while Averno won block B. In the end Dragón Rojo Jr. won the final by disqualification.

Production

Background
Starting in 1996 the Mexican professional wrestling promotion Consejo Mundial de Lucha Libre ("World Wrestling Council"; CMLL) held their first ever La Copa Junior tournament. CMLL held the tournament to celebrate the fact that lucha libre in Mexico is often a family tradition, with a large number of second, third, or even fourth generation wrestlers following the footsteps of their relatives. The premise of the tournament is that all participants are second-generation or more, although at times the family relationship is a storylines family relationship and not an actual one. One example of this is Dragón Rojo Jr. being billed as the grandson of Dragón Rojo, when in reality that is simply a storyline created by CMLL. The original La Copa Junior was won by  Héctor Garza.

CMLL would not hold another La Copa Junior until the 2005 tournament (won by Shocker), followed by a 2006 tournament won by Dos Caras Jr. The tournament did not return until 2010 where Dragón Rojo Jr. won the 2010 version. In 2012 third-generation luchador La Sombra won the Junior cup

In 2014, CMLL held two La Copa Junior tournaments, first a tournament on January 1, won by Super Halcón Jr., followed by a VIP tournament, featuring higher card wrestlers than the usual tournaments, which was won by Máximo The semi-regular tournament returned in 2016, won by Esfinge In 2017, Soberano Jr. won the La Copa Junior Nuevos Valores

Storylines
The tournament featured a number of professional wrestling matches with different wrestlers involved in pre-existing scripted feuds, plots and storylines. Wrestlers were portrayed as either heels (referred to as rudos in Mexico, those that portray the "bad guys") or faces (técnicos in Mexico, the "good guy" characters) as they followed a series of tension-building events, which culminated in a wrestling match or series of matches.

Family relationship

Tournament
After not being promoted for three years CMLL brought La Copa Junior back as a late in the year tournament. The tournament included 20 wrestlers, four more than the other tournaments. the tournament was split into 2 blocks of 10 wrestlers, with a seeding Battle royal, where the final two wrestlers in the ring would only have to win one match to get into the semifinal, while everyone else in the block would have to win three. Block A, which took place on the December 10, 2010 Super Viernes show]] and had Dragón Rojo Jr. overcome the odds and defeat four wrestlers in a row to earn a spot in the final match. Rojo Jr. defeated Máximo, La Mascara, La Sombra and Volador Jr. Block B took place on the December 17, 2010 Super Viernes and saw Averno take advantage of the "short cut" as he defeated the other Battle royal survivor El Hijo del Fantasma to advance to the semifinal where he pinned longtime rival Místico to earn his spot in the tournament final.

The finals of the La Copa Junior tournament took place on a special Saturday night event on December 25, 2010. The end came after a distraction by Averno's cornerman Mephisto led Averno to land a low blow on Dragón Rojo Jr., only for the ruse to backfire on him as the referee saw the illegal move and disqualified Averno, making Dragón Rojo Jr. the 2010 La Copa Junior winner.

Brackets

Results

December 10

December 17

December 25

References

2010 in professional wrestling
2010 in Mexico
CMLL La Copa Junior
December 2010 events in Mexico